The Transamerica Pyramid is a 48-story modernist skyscraper in San Francisco, California, United States, and the second tallest building in the San Francisco skyline. Located at 600 Montgomery Street between Clay and Washington Streets in the city's Financial District, it was the tallest building in San Francisco from its completion in 1972 until 2018 when the newly-constructed Salesforce Tower surpassed its height. The building no longer houses the headquarters of the Transamerica Corporation, which moved its U.S. headquarters to Baltimore, Maryland. However, the building is still associated with the company by being depicted on the company's logo. On completion in 1972 it was the eighth-tallest building in the world. It is also a popular tourist site. In 2020, the building was sold to NYC investor Michael Shvo, who in 2022 hired Norman Foster to redesign the interiors and renovate the building.

History
The Transamerica building was commissioned by Transamerica CEO John (Jack) R. Beckett, with the claim that he wished to allow light in the street below.

Construction began in 1969 and finished in 1972, and was overseen by San Francisco–based contractor Dinwiddie Construction, now Hathaway Dinwiddie Construction Company. Transamerica moved its headquarters to the new building from across the street, where it had been based in a flatiron-shaped building now occupied by the Church of Scientology of San Francisco.

Although the tower is no longer Transamerica Corporation headquarters, it is still associated with the company and is depicted in the company's logo. The building is evocative of San Francisco and has become one of the many symbols of the city. Designed by architect William Pereira, it faced opposition during planning and construction and was sometimes referred to by detractors as "Pereira's Prick". John King of the San Francisco Chronicle summed up the improved opinion of the building in 2009 as "an architectural icon of the best sort – one that fits its location and gets better with age." King also wrote in 2011 that it is "a uniquely memorable building, a triumph of the unexpected, unreal and engaging all at once. ... It is a presence and a persona, snapping into different focus with every fresh angle, every shift in light."

The Transamerica Pyramid was the tallest skyscraper west of Chicago when constructed, surpassing the then Bank of America Center, also in San Francisco. It was surpassed by the Aon Center, Los Angeles, in 1974.

The building is thought to have been the intended target of a terrorist attack, involving the hijacking of airplanes as part of the Bojinka plot, which was foiled in 1995.

In 1999, Transamerica was acquired by Dutch insurance company Aegon. When the non-insurance operations of Transamerica were later sold to GE Capital, Aegon retained ownership of the building as an investment. In 2020, the building was purchased by SHVO and Deutsche Finance America for $650 million. In 2022, SHVO and partners hired architect Norman Foster to undertake a $250 million renovation.

The Transamerica Pyramid was the tallest skyscraper in San Francisco from 1972 to 2017, when it was surpassed by the under-construction Salesforce Tower. It is one of 39 San Francisco high rises reported by the U.S. Geological Survey as potentially vulnerable to a large earthquake, due to a flawed welding technique.

Design
The land use and zoning restrictions for the parcel limited the number of square feet of office that could be built upon the lot, which sits at the north boundary of the financial district.

The building is a tall, four-sided pyramid with two "wings" to accommodate an elevator shaft on the east and a stairwell and a smoke tower on the west. The top  of the building is the spire. There are four cameras pointed in the four cardinal directions at the top of this spire forming the "Transamerica Virtual Observation Deck." Four monitors in the lobby, whose direction and zoom can be controlled by visitors, display the cameras' views 24 hours a day. An observation deck on the 27th floor was closed: the Pyramid's official website says that it was closed to the public in 2001, while the New York Times reported that it has been closed "[s]ince the late 1990s". It was replaced by the virtual observation deck a few years later. The video signal from the "Transamericam" was used for years by a local TV news station for live views of traffic and weather in downtown San Francisco.

The top of the Transamerica Pyramid is covered with aluminum panels. During the Christmas holiday season, on Independence Day, and during the anniversary of 9/11, a brightly twinkling beacon called the "Crown Jewel" is lit at the top of the pyramid.

Park 

At the base of the building is a half-acre privately owned public space designed by Tom Galli called Redwood Park. A number of redwood trees were transplanted to this park from the Santa Cruz Mountains when the tower was built. It is generally open to the public during the daytime. It features a fountain and pond designed by Anthony Guzzardo, containing a jumping frog and lily pads bronze sculpture commemorating "The Celebrated Jumping Frog of Calaveras County" by Mark Twain (sculpture by Richard Clopton, 1996); a Glenna Goodacre bronze sculpture of children at play (1989); a bronze plaque honoring the dogs Bummer and Lazarus, celebrating their skill at catching rats; and benches and tables offering respite to workers and visitors alike.

Specifications

 The building's façade is covered in crushed quartz, giving the building its light color.
 It has 3,678 windows.
Several thousand dollars in coins were thrown into the pit by observers surrounding the site at street level during the pouring, for good luck. 
 Only two of the building's 18 elevators reach the top floor.
 The original proposal was for a  building, which for a year would have been the second-tallest completed building in the world. The proposal was rejected by the city planning commission, saying it would interfere with views of San Francisco Bay from Nob Hill.
 The building is on the site that was the temporary home of A. P. Giannini's Bank of Italy after the 1906 San Francisco earthquake destroyed its office. Giannini founded Transamerica in 1928 as a holding company for his financial empire. Bank of Italy later became Bank of America.
 There is a plaque commemorating two famous dogs, Bummer and Lazarus, at the base of the building.
 The hull of the whaling vessel Niantic, an artifact of the 1849 California Gold Rush, lay almost beneath the Transamerica Pyramid, and the location is marked by a historical plaque outside the building (California Historical Landmark #88).
 The aluminum cap is indirectly illuminated from within to balance the appearance at night.
 The two wings increase interior space at the upper levels. One extension is the top of elevator shafts while the other is a smoke evacuation tower for fire-fighting.
 A glass pyramid cap sits at the top and encloses a red aircraft warning light and the brighter seasonal beacon.
 Because of the shape of the building, the majority of the windows can pivot 360 degrees so they can be washed from the inside.
 The spire is actually hollow and lined with a 100-foot steel stairway at a 60 degree angle, followed by two steel ladders.
 The conference room (with 360 degree views of the city) is located on the 48th floor.
 Construction began in 1969 and the first tenants moved in during the summer of 1972.

Tenants
 ATEL Capital Group
Bank of America Merrill Lynch
Crux Informatics
Greenhill & Co.
Heller Manus Architects
Incapture Group
Mars Inc.
On Lok
Pantheon Ventures
Rembrandt Venture Partners
TSG Consumer Partners
Union Square Advisors LLC
URS Corporation

Similar structures
The Shard, a building in London
Burj Khalifa, a building in Dubai
Ryugyong Hotel, a building in Pyongyang

See also

 List of tallest buildings in San Francisco
 49-Mile Scenic Drive
 List of tallest buildings
 List of tallest pyramids

References

External links

 
 About the Pyramid at Transamerica Corporation
 Transamerica Pyramid at PropertyShark

Office buildings completed in 1972
Insurance company headquarters in the United States
Skyscraper office buildings in San Francisco
Modernist architecture in California
Pyramids in the United States
William Pereira buildings
Financial District, San Francisco
Leadership in Energy and Environmental Design platinum certified buildings
1972 establishments in California